Matthew Lopez  (born December 12, 1987) is an American mixed martial artist who competed in the bantamweight division of the Ultimate Fighting Championship (UFC).

Background
Lopez was born in Safford, Arizona, United States. Lopez's father was the kid wrestling coach at Safford and he started training wrestling when he was young. He was a four time state champion wrestler at Sunnyside High School. He competed in wrestling in college at Arizona State University and Cal State Fullerton. After his collegiate wrestling career was over, he moved to MMA after seeing some of the wrestlers did well in MMA competitions.

Mixed martial arts career

Early career 
Lopez competed most of his fights in King of the Cage (KOTC) and Resurrection Fighting Alliance (RFA) MMA promotions prior joining UFC.

Ultimate Fighting Championship 
On Dana White's Looking for a Fight (Season 1 Ep.6) web series show at Sioux Falls, White was impressed with Lopez's performance and signed Lopez into UFC.

Lopez made his promotional debut against Rani Yahya on July 13, 2016 at UFC Fight Night: McDonald vs. Lineker. He lost the fight via submission (arm-triangle choke) in the third round.

On his second appearance in UFC, Lopez faced Mitch Gagnon on December 10, 2016 at UFC 206. He won the fight by unanimous decision.

On June 3, 2017, Lopez faced Johnny Eduardo at UFC 212. He won the fight via TKO in the first round. In the post fight interview, Lopez thought referee Mario Yamasaki was biased and believed Yamasaki should have stopped the fight much earlier.

Lopez faced Raphael Assunção on November 11, 2017 at UFC Fight Night: Poirier vs. Pettis. At the weigh-ins, Lopez missed weight, weighing in at 138.5 lbs., two and a half pounds over the bantamweight limit. As a result, he forfeited 20% of his purse to Assunção and the bout proceeded at a catchweight. He lost the fight via knockout in the third round.

Lopez faced Alejandro Pérez on April 14, 2018 at UFC on Fox 29. He lost the fight via TKO in the second round.

Lopez faced Brad Katona on December 8, 2018 at UFC 231. He lost the fight by unanimous decision.

On March 19, 2020, it was reported that Lopez was no longer part of the UFC's roster.

Personal life 
The journey from wrestling to fighting in UFC was a tough one. Lopez was broke during his college years and forced to stay in a house without water and electricity for some time as he could not afford to pay the rent.

Mixed martial arts record

|-
|Loss
|align=center|10–4
|Brad Katona
|Decision (unanimous)
|UFC 231 
|
|align=center|3
|align=center|5:00
|Toronto, Ontario, Canada
|
|- 
| Loss
| align=center| 10–3
|Alejandro Pérez
|TKO (knees and punches)
|UFC on Fox: Poirier vs. Gaethje
|
|align=center|2
|align=center|3:42
|Glendale, Arizona, United States
|
|-
| Loss
| align=center| 10–2
| Raphael Assunção
| KO (punch)
| UFC Fight Night: Poirier vs. Pettis
| 
| align=center| 3
| align=center| 1:50
| Norfolk, Virginia, United States
|
|-
| Win
| align=center| 10–1
| Johnny Eduardo
| TKO (punches)
|UFC 212
| 
| align=center| 1
| align=center| 2:57
| Rio de Janeiro, Brazil
|
|-
| Win
| align=center| 9–1
| Mitch Gagnon
| Decision (unanimous)
|UFC 206
| 
| align=center| 3
| align=center| 5:00
| Toronto, Ontario, Canada
|
|-
| Loss
| align=center| 8–1
| Rani Yahya
| Submission (arm-triangle choke)
| UFC Fight Night: McDonald vs. Lineker
| 
| align=center| 3
| align=center| 4:19
| Sioux Falls, South Dakota, United States
|
|-
| Win
| align=center| 8–0
| Eli Finn
| Submission (elbows and punches)
| RFA 37
| 
| align=center| 1
| align=center| 3:15
| Sioux Falls, South Dakota, United States
|
|-
| Win
| align=center| 7–0
| Justin Linn
| Submission (face lock)
| RFA 31
| 
| align=center| 1
| align=center| 2:16
| Las Vegas, Nevada, United States
|
|-
| Win
| align=center| 6–0
| Kevin Clark
| Submission (rear-naked choke)
| RFA 29
| 
| align=center| 1
| align=center| 0:36
| Sioux Falls, South Dakota, United States
|
|-
| Win
| align=center| 5–0
| Devin Turner
| Submission (rear-naked choke)
| RFA 25
| 
| align=center| 1
| align=center| 2:46
| Sioux Falls, South Dakota, United States
|
|-
| Win
| align=center| 4–0
| John Robles
| TKO (punches)
| RFA 21
| 
| align=center| 1
| align=center| 1:35
| Costa Mesa, California, United States
|
|-
| Win
| align=center| 3–0
| Miguelito Marti
| TKO (punches)
| Gladiator Challenge: Iron Fist
| 
| align=center| 1
| align=center| 1:13
| San Jacinto, California, United States
|
|-
| Win
| align=center| 2–0
| Sammy Silva
| Decision (unanimous)
| KOTC: Heated Fury
| 
| align=center| 3
| align=center| 5:00
| Scottsdale, Arizona, United States
|
|-
| Win
| align=center| 1–0
| Imani Jackson
| TKO (punches)
| KOTC: World Championships
| 
| align=center| 1
| align=center| 4:05
| Scottsdale, Arizona, United States
|

See also
 List of current UFC fighters
 List of male mixed martial artists

References

External links
 
 

Living people
1987 births
American male mixed martial artists
Bantamweight mixed martial artists
Mixed martial artists utilizing collegiate wrestling
Mixed martial artists utilizing boxing
Mixed martial artists utilizing Brazilian jiu-jitsu
Mixed martial artists from Arizona
People from Graham County, Arizona
Ultimate Fighting Championship male fighters
American male sport wrestlers
American practitioners of Brazilian jiu-jitsu